Christchurch College of Education (CCE) was an educational institute based in Christchurch, New Zealand. It was founded in 1877, and ceased operation in 2007 when it was merged with the University of Canterbury.

The educationalist Colin Knight was principal from 1986 to 1995.

Notes

Defunct universities and colleges in New Zealand
Education in Christchurch
University of Canterbury
Colleges of education in New Zealand